The 1933 Troy State Red Wave football team represented Troy State Teachers College (now known as Troy University) as an independent during the 1933 college football season. Led by third-year head coach Albert Elmore, the Red Wave compiled an overall record of 5–1.

Schedule

References

Troy State
Troy Trojans football seasons
Troy State Red Wave football